Mattia Proietti (born 27 February 1992) is an Italian football player who plays as a midfielder for Ternana.

Club career
He made his Serie C debut for Bassano on 4 September 2011 in a game against Virtus Lanciano.

On 10 July 2019, he signed a 3-year contract with Ternana.

References

External links
 

1992 births
Footballers from Turin
Living people
Italian footballers
S.C. Vallée d'Aoste players
Bassano Virtus 55 S.T. players
Delfino Pescara 1936 players
S.S. Teramo Calcio players
Serie B players
Serie C players
Serie D players
Association football midfielders